Barry Francis Fry (born 7 April 1945) is an English former football player and manager. An inside forward, Fry was an apprentice at Manchester United in his youth, and had brief spells with Bolton Wanderers, Luton Town and Leyton Orient, before he retired prematurely due to injury.

He has managed Dunstable Town, Bedford Town, Maidstone United, Southend United, Barnet, Birmingham City and, most recently, Peterborough United. Fry is currently director of football at Peterborough.

Career
In 1974, Dunstable Town received the financial backing of Keith Cheesman. He hired a young Barry Fry as manager, and gave him money to build up a strong team; indeed in his autobiography, Fry claims that he was often given blank, signed cheques. Of note, both Jeff Astle and George Best were brought in to play for the team with Best playing two pre-season games to promote interest in the club. Dunstable were promoted under Fry, but he was later dismissed by Cheeseman's successor, Billy Kitt, after a poor performance in the Southern League. 

After spells at Hillingdon Borough and hometown club Bedford Town, in 1979 Fry became Barnet manager for the first of two management spells covering almost thirteen seasons. In his first spell, Barnet maintained a mid-table position in the Alliance League for six seasons before Fry left in December 1985 to manage Maidstone United. He returned to Barnet in August 1986 for a further seven seasons. Three times runners-up in the GM Vauxhall Conference, Fry achieved his first managerial success as Champions in 1990–91. Two years later he guided them towards the new Division Two (leaving two months before the end of the season to manage Southend United) despite being sacked eight times and reinstated each time by controversial chairman Stan Flashman, as well as being in charge of a club which was in a precarious financial state and under threat of expulsion from the Football League. 

Fry moved to Southend United in 1993 with the club bottom of Division One. Fry kept Southend up, but later in the year moved to Birmingham City. Though Birmingham were relegated in his first season, he won the Division Two championship and the Football League Trophy in 1994–95. During the 1995–96 season, Fry guided the Blues to the semi-finals of the League Cup but was sacked after the club finished 15th in Division One.

Just after leaving Birmingham, Fry became chairman-manager of Peterborough United. They were relegated to Division Three in his first season at the helm but they regained their Division Two status three years later. Fry's nine-year reign as manager came to an end in May 2005 after they were relegated again, after which time he took up a role as director of football. Fry remained as chairman until September 2006 when Darragh MacAnthony succeeded him.

Fry in popular culture
Fry starred in a documentary called There's Only One Barry Fry. The programme included some of Fry's dressing room antics, including a row with Mick Bodley and his promise to get the Posh out of Division Two.

Betting controversy
In December 2018, Fry was charged by the Football Association for alleged misconduct in relation to betting after claims that he placed bets on matches or competitions during the 2017–18 season, in breach of FA rules. He accepted the charges, and on 31 January 2019 he was suspended from all footballing activity for four months, with three months of those suspended for a two-year period.

Managerial statistics

Note: These figures include only those matches in Soccerbases database.

HonoursBarnet Football Conference: 1990–91
 Football Conference runner-up: 1986–87, 1987–88, 1989–90
 Conference League Cup: 1988–89Birmingham City Football League Second Division: 1994–95
 Football League Trophy: 1994–95Peterborough United Football League Third Division play-off winner: 1999–2000Individual'
 Football Conference Manager of the Month: September 1986, January 1987

Notes

References

1945 births
Living people
Sportspeople from Bedford
Association football inside forwards
English footballers
Manchester United F.C. players
Bolton Wanderers F.C. players
Luton Town F.C. players
Leyton Orient F.C. players
Ebbsfleet United F.C. players
Romford F.C. players
Bedford Town F.C. players
Dunstable Town F.C. players
St Albans City F.C. players
English Football League players
English football managers
Dunstable Town F.C. managers
Hillingdon Borough F.C. managers
Bedford Town F.C. managers
Barnet F.C. managers
Maidstone United F.C. (1897) managers
Southend United F.C. managers
Birmingham City F.C. managers
Peterborough United F.C. managers
National League (English football) managers
English Football League managers
Footballers from Bedfordshire